Assaf Elkanna Granit is an Israeli chef and owner of the Parisian restaurant Shabour. In January 2021, Granit was awarded a Michelin star for his Shabour restaurant.  It is the first Michelin star awarded to an Israeli restaurant in France.

Career

Shabour 
He opened the restaurant in September 2019. In October 2019, Forbes named in one of the trendiest new restaurants in Paris. In November, Granit won a major award from the French culinary magazine Le Fooding. In December 2019, the restaurant was named the best restaurant in the French capital by Le Figaroscope, published by the French daily Le Figaro. In January 2021, Shabour received a Michelin star and Serena Williams, among other celebrities, enjoyed a meal there.

Other restaurants 
Granit owns and operates other restaurants including Balagan (Paris, opened 2017), the Palomar (London), Sella (Saint Barthelemy, opened 2022) and Machneyuda (Israel, opened 2009). He owns other restaurants with business partner Uri Navon as well. Granit was born and trained in Jerusalem.

Other projects 
In November 2020, Granit won the tender to open six restaurants to feed approximately 3000 employees at the Wix campus in Tel Aviv. The campus is set to open in 2022 and Granit's team won the tender to provide all of their meals.

Television 
In 2022, he was a judge on the first Israeli season of the The Next Restaurant.

References 

Israeli chefs
Michelin Guide

Year of birth missing (living people)
Living people